The award Das Goldene Brett vorm Kopf (English translation: "The Golden Blockhead", literal translation "The Golden Board in Front of the Head") is a negative prize awarded by the Society for the Scientific Investigation of Pseudosciences (GWUP – Gesellschaft zur wissenschaftlichen Untersuchung von Parawissenschaften). The prize is organised by the Viennese regional group, the Society for Critical Thinking (GkD – Gesellschaft für kritisches Denken). The jury considers the "most astonishing pseudo-scientific nuisance" of the year in German-speaking countries. The award was presented for the first time in 2011 during the Sceptics Conference in Vienna. In 2016, the prize was presented simultaneously for the first time in Vienna and Hamburg (by the Hamburg sceptics of the GWUP).

Process
Candidates are nominated via a form. A jury of experts selects the three top candidates among the nominees. The assessment is based on the following: degree of deviance, resistance to criticism, commercial interest, radius of action, pseudoscience, and hazard potential. In the course of a public award ceremony, three candidates are presented by a eulogist in an ironic speech. The three candidates can comment on their nomination. Thereafter the winner is announced, and they are given a golden statue with a board in front of the head and have the option of making an acceptance speech. In 2012, the jury of experts included Heinz Oberhummer (physicist), Werner Gruber (physicist), Johannes Grenzfurthner (artist) and the eulogists Mario Sixtus (journalist), El Awadalla (writer) and Niko Alm (entrepreneur and activist).

In 2012, an additional "lifetime achievement prize" was awarded for the first time. This prize recognizes a person who, according to the jury, "made a name with particularly impressive resistance to scientific facts over decades".
The award was granted in 2012 by the Austrian Consumer Information Consortium (Verein für Konsumenteninformation) and since 2013 by the German Consumers' Union (Deutscher Konsumentenbund). The Austrian branch of the Cochrane Collaboration was a cooperation partner in 2015.

Winners and nominees

Media recognition
Media recognition ranges from numerous mentions in the blogosphere, such as ScienceBlogs (Astrodicticum Simplex, Kritisch gedacht or Fischblog and Mathlog) to Austrian media such as Der Standard Die Presse, ORF, News, Heute and Vice.

References

Austrian awards
Ironic and humorous awards